Beautiful Things is the  second studio album by Circa Survive's vocalist, Anthony Green. It was released on January 17, 2012, and peaked at No. 27 on the Billboard 200 chart.

The album features Keith Goodwin, Dan Schwartz and Tim Arnold from the band Good Old War as his backing band.
 
An early mix of the song "Big Mistake" was released digitally on July 7, 2011.

The first single, "Get Yours While You Can", was released on November 15, 2011. A music video for this song was made by the director Isaac Ravishankara in late November 2011 in Brooklyn and was released on January 31, 2012.
 
Chino Moreno of Deftones, Nate Ruess of fun., Norwegian rock artist Ida Maria and fellow Circa Survive musician Colin Frangicetto are the confirmed guests appearing on the bonus tracks of the record.

The entire album was put up for streaming on Green's website on January 11, 2012.

Track listing

References

2012 albums
Anthony Green (musician) albums